Dissosteira longipennis, the high plains locust, is a species of band-winged grasshopper in the family Acrididae. It is found in North America. During the 1930s, it formed enormous swarms and caused significant damage to crops in the western United States, but it is now very rare and has not swarmed since. However rare, the species is still extant, unlike the Rocky Mountain locust, the only other species of locust found in North America.

References

Oedipodinae
Articles created by Qbugbot
Insects described in 1872